The Grapsidae are a family of crabs known variously as marsh crabs, shore crabs, or talon crabs. The family has not been confirmed to form a monophyletic group and some taxa may belong in other families. They are found along the shore among rocks, in estuaries, marshes, and in some cases pelagic among drifting seaweeds and flotsam.

Genera
A number of taxa, formerly treated as subfamilies of the family Grapsidae are now considered families in their own right, including the Varunidae and Plagusiidae. Ten genera remain in the family, two of them known only from fossils:
Geograpsus Stimpson, 1858
Goniopsis De Haan, 1833
Grapsus Lamarck, 1801
Leptograpsodes Montgomery, 1931
Leptograpsus H. Milne Edwards, 1853
Litograpsus † Schweitzer & Karasawa, 2004
Metopograpsus H. Milne Edwards, 1853
Miograpsus † Fleming, 1981
Pachygrapsus Randall, 1840
Planes Bowdich, 1825

References

External links

 
Decapod families